Bernard Pierre Loiselle (born 2 May 1948 in Saint-Marc-sur-Richelieu, Quebec) was a Liberal party
member of the House of Commons of Canada. He was a lawyer by career.

He was first elected at the Chambly riding in the 1974 general election.

Timeline

Election campaigns
 1974 federal election: Elected at Chambly
 1979 federal election: Elected at Verchères
 1980 federal election: Elected at Verchères
 1984 federal election: Defeated at Verchères
 1988 federal election: Defeated at Chambly

Caucus service
 30 September 1974 – 9 July 1984: Liberal Party of Canada, to end of 32nd Parliament

External links
 

1948 births
Living people
Members of the House of Commons of Canada from Quebec
Liberal Party of Canada MPs
People from Montérégie